= Advantage Controls =

Company specializing in water treatment equipment and accessories

Advantage Controls is a family-owned company based in Muskogee, Oklahoma that specializes in water treatment equipment and accessories. Advantage Controls has equipment in every continent barring Antarctica.

== History ==
Advantage Controls was started in 1994, in the 1,100 foot garage of the owner Dick Morris and son Chris Morris in Downtown Muskogee, Oklahoma. In 1995, Dan Morris assumed control of Advantage Controls and remains as CEO of the company.

Since its establishment in 1994, the Advantage Controls plant has expanded twice and is now located in the Muskogee Industrial Park in a plant covering over 50,000 square feet. In 2013, Advantage was ranked one of the largest manufactures in the city of Muskogee and has over 145 employees.

== Products ==
Advantage Controls offers controllers, metering pumps, and accessories.

=== Controllers ===
Advantage Controls has the widest selection of controllers. Their signature controller is the MegaTron, which also comes in a more compact SS model. The MegaTron come with its own online communications software, Web Advantage, that allows the controller to be remotely monitored and sends email to keep users informed. Advantage Controls also offers the NanoTron, MicroTron, and analog controllers.

== Awards ==
| Award | Year |
|---|---|
| Supplier of the Year | 2006 |
| Entrepreneurial Excellence in Oklahoma | 2013 |
| Governor's Award for Excellence in Exporting | 2014 |
